Soni Radovanović (born ) is a Serbian professional rugby league footballer who has played in the 2000s and 2010s.

Background
Soni Radovanović was born in Belgrade, Yugoslavia.

References

External links
Profile at whitehavenrl.co.uk
Statistics at ragbiliga.rs

1988 births
Living people
Expatriate rugby league players in England
Expatriate rugby league players in France
Expatriate rugby league players in Russia
London Skolars players
RC Lescure-Arthes XIII players
Rugby articles needing expert attention
Rugby league locks
Rugby league props
Rugby league second-rows
Serbia national rugby league team captains
Serbia national rugby league team players
Serbian expatriate rugby league players
Serbian expatriate sportspeople in England
Serbian expatriate sportspeople in France
Serbian expatriate sportspeople in Russia
Serbian rugby league players
Whitehaven R.L.F.C. players
Woolston Rovers players